Game of Outlaws (Thai: เกมล่าทรชน, RTGS: Kem La Thorachon) is a Thai thriller-action-crime drama based on the drama Prajan Lai Payak (พระจันทร์ลายพยัคฆ์). The story centers around Janenaree and Lalisa, two sisters who set out to become cops in order to avenge their father's murder. Janenaree was adopted to be Lalisa's sister due to her father dying while fighting criminals. They therefore enter the agency of Inspector Non who is following Sakda's case. However, in an unfortunate incident, due to anger from Sakda's taunting, Janenaree accidentally kills Sakda and is imprisoned. While in prison, their mother died. Lalisa was furious at Janenaree that it causes a fracturing of relations between the two sisters. While Janenaree was in Jail, she was scouted by Commander Pim to fight the drug dealers. Janenaree became a subordinate to Sakda's half-brother Mawin after her release from jail. However, her mission was a secret and this created more misunderstandings between Janenaree and Lalisa. A pounding war ensues.

The story was written and directed by Nok Chatchai Plengpanich. It airs on Channel 3 from 20:30 to 22:30. It airs fro 28 October 2021 to 30 December 2021. It also airs on Netflix in 10 countries: Laos, Cambodia, Myanmar, Vietnam, the Philippines, Indonesia, Brunei, Singapore, Malaysia, and Timor-Leste.

Production 
Mark Prin and Taew Natapohn reunite after working together in the drama Rak Nakara. This is Taew Natapohn's first full action drama. Nok Chatchai, the director of the movie also plays in the drama. This is Toon Pimpawee's first collaboration with Channel 3 after his contract with Channel 7 expires. This script has been made into a drama twice, the first time in 2010 using the title "Prajan Lai Payak", the second time in 2021, being this one. Both scripts were based on the original poem by Naphut Susri.

Cast

References

Extra information 

 เรื่องย่อละคร เกมล่าทรชน : Ch3Thailand
 เรื่องย่อละคร เกมล่าทรชน : MGR Online

Thai_action_television_series
2021_Thai_television_series_debuts
2021_Thai_television_series_endings